2016 Regional League Division 2 Bangkok Metropolitan Region is the 8th season of the League competition since its establishment in 2009. It is in the third tier of the Thai football league system.

Changes from Last Season

Team Changes

Promoted Clubs

No club was promoted to the Thai Division 1 League. Last years league champions Customs United and runners up Chamchuri United failed to qualify from the 2015 Regional League Division 2 championsleague round.

Relocated Club
Grakcu Tabfah Pathum Thani  re-located to the Regional League Bangkok Area Division from the Central-West Division 2015.
Assumption United moved into the Western Region.
Customs United moved into the Bangkok-East Region.
Kasem Bundit University moved into the Bangkok-East Region.
Rayong United moved into the Eastern Region.

Returning Clubs

Central Lions is returning to the league after withdrawn from the 2013.

Renamed Clubs

 Central Lions renamed Air Force Robinson.

Withdrawn Clubs

RBAC have withdrawn from the 2016 campaign.

Stadium and locations

League table

Results

Season statistics

Top scorers
As of 2 September 2016.

See also
 2016 Thai Premier League
 2016 Thai Division 1 League
 2016 Regional League Division 2
 2016 Thai FA Cup
 2016 Thai League Cup
 2016 Kor Royal Cup

References

External links
  Division 2

Regional League Bangkok Area Division seasons